Janet W. Hardy is an American writer and sex educator, and founder of Greenery Press. She has also been published as Catherine A. Liszt and Lady Green. She is the author or co-author of eleven books, and frequently collaborates with Dossie Easton.

She is genderqueer (and uses female pronouns), bisexual, and polyamorous.

Books authored or co-authored by Janet Hardy

 Dossie Easton, Janet W. Hardy, The New Topping Book. Greenery Press, 2003. .
 Dossie Easton, Janet W. Hardy, The New Bottoming Book. Greenery Press, 2001. .
 Dossie Easton, Catherine A. Liszt, When Someone You Love Is Kinky. Greenery Press, 2000. .
 Easton, Dossie and Catherine A. Liszt. The Ethical Slut. A Guide to Infinite Sexual Possibilities. San Francisco: Greenery Press, 1997. . . .
 Dossie Easton and Janet W. Hardy. The Ethical Slut: A Practical Guide to Polyamory, Open Relationships & Other Adventures. Second edition. Celestial Arts, 2009. . 
 Janet W. Hardy and Dossie Easton. The Ethical Slut: A Practical Guide to Polyamory, Open Relationships & Other Freedoms in Sex and Love.  Third Edition. Ten Speed Press, 2017. .
 Lady Green, The Sexually Dominant Woman: a Workbook for Nervous Beginners, Greenery Press, 1998.  
 Lady Green, The Compleat Spanker, Greenery Press, 2000. .
 Lady Green (edit.), Jaymes Easton (edit.), Kinky Crafts: 101 Do-It-Yourself S/M Toys, Greenery Press, 1998, 
 Charles Moser, Janet Hardy, Sex Disasters... and How to Survive Them, Greenery Press, 2002. .
 Janet Hardy, The Toybag Guide to Canes and Caning, Greenery Press, 2004. .
 Dossie Easton, Janet W. Hardy, Radical Ecstasy, Greenery Press, 2004. .
 Janet Hardy, 21st Century Kinkycrafts, Greenery Press, 2005. 
 Janet W. Hardy, Girlfag:  A Life Told in Sex and Musicals, Beyond Binary Books, 2012. .
 Janet W. Hardy, Impervious: Confessions of a Semi-Retired Deviant.  Sincyr Publishing , 2019. .

Film and TV
 BDSM: It's not what you think (2008)
 Vice & Consent  (2005)
 "Sex TV"—Girl Show/The Ethical Slut/Sex and the Beard? (2002)
 Beyond Vanilla (2001)
 The Dr. Susan Block Show (1996)

Awards
She received the Geoff Mains Nonfiction Book Award from the National Leather Association in 2019 for The Sexually Dominant Woman: An Illustrated Guide for Nervous Beginners, and in 2020 for Impervious: Confessions of a Semi-Retired Deviant.

She is an inductee of the Society of Janus Hall of Fame.

References

BDSM writers
American bisexual writers
Living people
Year of birth missing (living people)
American relationships and sexuality writers
20th-century American women writers
20th-century American non-fiction writers
Businesspeople from the San Francisco Bay Area
Non-binary writers
Writers from the San Francisco Bay Area
21st-century American non-fiction writers
21st-century American women writers
20th-century pseudonymous writers
21st-century pseudonymous writers
Pseudonymous women writers
Polyamorous people
Bisexual non-binary people